TNGHT is a musical duo consisting of Scottish producer Hudson Mohawke and Canadian producer Lunice, formed in 2011. The duo released their self-titled debut EP to positive reviews in 2012. They announced an indefinite hiatus in late 2013, until their return in September 2019.

Biography

Hudson Mohawke (Ross Birchard) and Lunice (Lunice Fermin Pierre II) originally met in 2008, during the first LuckyMe Records tour of North America, when Mohawke performed at the Pop Montreal festival and Lunice played support.

Following a successful performance headlining Warp Records' 2012 SXSW showcase, TNGHT officially debuted with the TNGHT EP, released via Warp X LuckyMe on July 23, 2012.

TNGHT has since performed at multiple venues internationally, including The Opera House, the Coachella music festival and Brooklyn's Music Hall of Williamsburg, which featured an appearance by rapper/producer Kanye West during a remix of West's "Cold".

In 2012, TNGHT produced "Shake Weight" from Duality by Captain Murphy (rap project of Flying Lotus).

In 2013, TNGHT co-produced Kanye West's song "Blood on the Leaves" from his critically acclaimed album Yeezus. The song samples TNGHT's track "R U Ready."

The duo announced their hiatus on December 27, 2013.

On March 8, 2016, Hudson Mohawke tweeted a photo stating: Sneak peek of the @tnght studio sessions.

On June 20, 2017, during an interview with Red Bull Music Academy Lunice announced the band was working on new music.

On September 22, 2019, the duo released "Serpent", their first song in over six years. On October 23, 2019, the duo announced their next EP, "II", along with the release of the song "Dollaz".

On November 4, 2021, the duo released "Tums" as a celebratory song to mark the approaching end of the quarantine caused by the COVID-19 pandemic.

Discography

Extended plays

Singles

Remixes

2012: Kanye West, Big Sean & Jay-Z - "Clique"
2012: Waka Flocka Flame - "Rooster in My Rari"
2013: Kanye West - "Cold"

References

External links 
 TNGHT official page (via Warp Records)

Scottish electronic music groups
Scottish musical duos
Electronic music duos
Trap musicians (EDM)